St. Xavier's Pre-University College, Gulbarga is a Jesuit post-secondary college that opened in 2010 north of Simoor, in Karnataka, India. It offers plus-two courses in Science, Commerce, and Arts. It also offers coaching for NEET, IIT, and CET entrance examinations and for entrance to engineering colleges.

St Xavier's PU College, Gulbarga, secured a 100% result in its first batch of Arts and of Commerce in 2012.

See also
 List of Jesuit educational institutions

References  

Jesuit universities and colleges in India
Pre University colleges in Karnataka
Education in Kalaburagi
Educational institutions established in 2009
2009 establishments in Karnataka